Gil Parrondo Rico OAXS (17 June 1921 – 24 December 2016) was a Spanish art director, set decorator and production designer. He won two Academy Awards and was nominated for another in the category of Best Art Direction.

Selected filmography
 High Fashion (1954)
 An Andalusian Gentleman (1954)
 The Girl from the Red Cabaret (1973)
 The Grandfather (1998)

Parrondo won two Academy Awards for Best Art Direction and was nominated for another:
Won
 Patton (1970)
 Nicholas and Alexandra (1971)
Nominated
 Travels with My Aunt (1972)

Honours
 Gold Medal of Merit in Fine Arts (Kingdom of Spain, 22 June 1983).
 Knight Grand Cross of the Civil Order of Alfonso X, the Wise (Posthumous, Kingdom of Spain, 27 January 2017).

See also
 List of Spanish Academy Award winners and nominees

References

External links
 
 

1921 births
2016 deaths
People from Asturias
Spanish art directors
Spanish set decorators
Best Art Direction Academy Award winners
Spanish production designers
Recipients of the Civil Order of Alfonso X, the Wise